Neodymium perrhenate is an inorganic compound with the chemical formula Nd(ReO4)3, which exists in anhydrous and tetrahydrate. It can be obtained by reacting excess neodymium oxide with 240 g/L perrhenic acid solution. In its solution, NdReO42+ and Nd(ReO4)2+ can be observed with stability constants of 16.5 and 23.6, respectively.

Nd4Re6O19 can be obtained by reacting neodymium perrhenate and NdRe2 at high temperature.

See also 
 Neodymium
 Rhenium
 Perrhenate

References 

Perrhenates
Neodymium compounds